We Will Go to Deauville (French: Nous irons à Deauville) is a 1962 French Comedy film directed by Francis Rigaud, written by Francis Rigaud and Jacques Vilfrid, starring Michel Serrault and Louis de Funès (uncredited). The film is known under the titles: "We Will Go to Deauville" (international English titles), "Io... 2 ville e 4 scocciatori" (Italy).

Cast 
 Michel Serrault as Mr Lucien Moreau, a colleague of Mr Mercier
 Louis de Funès as Ludovic Lambersac, the holidaymaker
 Pascale Roberts as Mrs Monique Moreau, wife of Lucien
 Claude Brasseur as Mr Maurice Dubois, a friend of "Moreau"
 Colette Castel as Mrs Jacqueline Dubois, wife of Maurice
 Michel Galabru as  Mr Mercier, the boss of Lucien
 Jean Carmet as the porter of baggages
 Marie Daëms as Marie-Laure Spiroza
 Roger Pierre as Mr Louis, owner of a hardware shop
 Jean-Marc Thibault as Mr Paul, the other owner of a hardware shop
 Maurice Cafarelli as the elder son of Mr Mercier
 Sacha Distel as singer
 Paul Préboist as The priest

References

External links 
 
 Nous irons à Deauville (1962) at the Films de France
  Nous irons à Deauville

1962 films
French comedy films
1960s French-language films
French black-and-white films
1960s French films